Kim Jiwan (born June 2, 1990) is a South Korean professional basketball player currently playing for the Incheon ET-Land Elephants of the Korean Basketball League (KBL).
He plays the shooting guard position.

Professional career
In 2012, Kim was signed by Incheon ET-Land Elephants of the Korean Basketball League (KBL).

On late May 2015, Barangay Ginebra San Miguel of Philippine Basketball Association (PBA) announced that Jiwan Kim will be their new Asian import replacing Sanchir Tungalag of Mongolia. He was being loaned to Barangay Ginebra by the Incheon ET Land Elephants of KBL to develop his game. He debuted in the PBA scoring 11 points, grabbing 5 rebounds and dishing 3 assists thus making a history by becoming the first South Korean professional basketball player to play in the PBA. After his stint in the Philippines, he returned to Korea.

Professional career statistics

Correct as of November 2015

Season-by-season averages

|-
| align=left | 2012–13
| align=left | ET-Land Elephants
| align=center | KBL || 24 || || 10.5 || .449 || .389 || .474 || 0.75 || 1.54 || .50 || .00 || 2.50
|-
| align=left | 2013–14
| align=left | ET-Land Elephants
| align=center | KBL || 54 || || 13.5 || .461 || .377 || .600 || 1.04 || 1.31 || .31 || .04 || 2.78
|-
| align=left | 2014–15
| align=left | ET-Land Elephants
| align=center | KBL || 55 || || 19.0 || .425 || .359 || .824 || 1.87 || 2.24 || .73 || .07 || 5.09
|-
| align=left | 2015
| align=left | Brgy. Ginebra Kings
| align=center | PBA || 6 || || 27.7 || .426 || .353 || .750 || 2.67 || 4.00 || .83 || .00 || 10.67
|-
| align=left | 2015–16
| align=left | ET-Land Elephants
| align=center | KBL || 22 || || 27.2 || .403 || .356 || .708 || 1.82 || 3.82 || .86 || .27 || 7.45
|-

References

External links
 Profile at KBL.or.kr

1990 births
Living people
Barangay Ginebra San Miguel players
Philippine Basketball Association imports
Shooting guards
South Korean men's basketball players
South Korean expatriate basketball people in the Philippines